The electoral district of Dandenong is an electoral district of the Victorian Legislative Assembly. It was first proclaimed in 1904 when the district of Dandenong and Berwick was abolished.

The district is located within the outskirts of Melbourne's south-east, containing both residential and industrial areas, as well as the Armada Dandenong Plaza and Churchill National Park. A very multicultural district, it has been a safe Labor seat since the 1970s.

Dandenong District comprises the suburbs of Dandenong, Doveton, Eumemmerring and parts of Dandenong North, Dandenong South, Endeavour Hills, Noble Park, Noble Park North and Rowville.

It is part of the South-Eastern Metropolitan Region for elections to the Legislative Council.

Members for Dandenong

Election results

Graphical summary

References

External links
 Electorate profile: Dandenong District, Victorian Electoral Commission
 South Eastern Metropolitan Region

Electoral districts of Victoria (Australia)
1904 establishments in Australia
Dandenong, Victoria
City of Casey
City of Greater Dandenong
Electoral districts and divisions of Greater Melbourne